
Gmina Koneck is a rural gmina (administrative district) in Aleksandrów County, Kuyavian-Pomeranian Voivodeship, in north-central Poland.

Villages
Gmina Koneck contains the villages of Brzeźno, Chromowola, Jeziorno, Kajetanowo, Kamieniec, Koneck, Kruszynek, Kruszynek-Kolonia, Młynek, Opalanka, Ossówka, Pomiany, Romanowo, Spoczynek, Straszewo, Święte, Zapustek, Zazdromin and Żołnowo.

Neighbouring gminas
Gmina Koneck is bordered by the gminas of Aleksandrów Kujawski, Bądkowo, Dąbrowa Biskupia, Raciążek, Waganiec and Zakrzewo.

References
Polish official population figures 2006

Koneck
Aleksandrów County